

The Sivel SD27 Corriedale is an Italian two-seat light touring or training monoplane designed and built by Sivel Aeronautica. The Corriedale is a low-wing monoplane with side-by-side seating for two, and is powered by a nose-mounted Rotax 912 piston engine. It has a fixed landing gear with a swivelling nosewheel. Five pre-series aircraft were produced in 1994 before production started in 1995 and the aircraft was certified under the JAR-VLA. An aerobatic variant flew in 1995 with a larger 119 kW (160 hp) engine.

Specifications

References

Notes

Bibliography

1990s Italian civil utility aircraft
Low-wing aircraft
Single-engined tractor aircraft
Aircraft first flown in 1994